The Ontario College Advanced Diploma (OCAD) is a post-secondary educational undergraduate three-year diploma, granted by colleges of applied arts and technology within Ontario, Canada. The undergraduate advanced diploma is awarded upon the completion of a three-year program of study at the undergraduate level.

According to the Ontario Qualifications Framework, the advanced diploma is listed as a level 8, whereas a basic certificate is a level 1 and a doctoral degree is level 13.

The diploma succeeds the Ontario College Diploma (OCD) and the Ontario College Certificate (OCC), awarded upon the completion of a two-year and one-year program respectively. It precedes a bachelor's degree.

See also 
 List of colleges in Ontario
 Higher education in Ontario

References 

Higher education in Ontario